Mike Law (March 9, 1942 – February 21, 2021) was a Grey Cup champion defensive back in the Canadian Football League.

A Queen's Golden Gael, Law started with the Hamilton Tiger-Cats in 1967 but played 6 seasons with the Edmonton Eskimos, where he scored 2 touchdowns (on a fumble and interception) and picked off 5 passes (4 in 1971.) After a year with the Winnipeg Blue Bombers he finished his career with the 1973 Grey Cup champion Ottawa Rough Riders.

References

1942 births
2021 deaths
Edmonton Elks players
Hamilton Tiger-Cats players
Ottawa Rough Riders players
Queen's Golden Gaels football players
Queen's University at Kingston alumni
Winnipeg Blue Bombers players
Sportspeople from Oakville, Ontario
Place of birth missing